Ma'anshan (525) is a Type 054 frigate of the People's Liberation Army Navy. She was commissioned on 18 February 2005.

Development and design 

The Type 054 has a stealthy hull design with sloped surfaces, radar absorbent materials, and a reduced superstructure clutter.

The main anti-ship armament were YJ-83 sea-skimming anti-ship cruise missiles in two four-cell launchers. It retained the HQ-7 SAM, an improved version of the French Crotale, from the preceding Type 053H3; the HQ-7 had a ready-to-fire 8-cell launcher, with 16 stored in the automatic reloader. Short range defence was improved with four AK-630 CIWS turrets. A 100 mm main gun, also based on a French design, was mounted.

Construction and career 
Ma'anshan was launched on 11 September 2003 at the Hudong-Zhonghua Shipyard in Shanghai. Commissioned on 18 February 2005.

On November 28, 2012, Ma'anshan, Zhoushan, Hangzhou, Ningbo and Poyanghu integrated supply ship formed a naval open sea training fleet , Passing through the Miyako Strait in batches and entering the waters of the Western Pacific to carry out routine training.

On September 25, 2013, Ma'anshan and Changzhou conducted an anti-submarine exercise organized by the East China Sea Fleet in the South China Sea. During the exercise, Ma'anshan and Changzhou ship-borne helicopters dropped several war mines and successfully destroyed the target.

In April 2014, Ma'anshan and other destroyers of the PLA Navy's East China Sea Fleet conducted formation anti-submarine and anti-missile training. 

During mid 2019, Ma'anshan was docked for overhaul.

Gallery

References 

2003 ships
Ships built in China
Type 054 frigates